Helen Antoinette Pedersen (July 16, 1916 – July 5, 1998) was an American amateur tennis player. She competed as Helen Rihbany in the 1940s from her marriage to Edward H. Rihbany and was later married to William McLaughlin.

Pedersen, raised in Stamford, Connecticut, was national junior champion in 1934 and made the semi-finals of the 1936 U.S. National Championships. She won the singles title at the U.S. Women's Indoor Championships in 1945 and 1946. In 1949 she made the singles semi-finals at Wimbledon and was also a quarter-finalist at the French Championships. During her career she was regularly ranked in the nation's top 10.

References

1916 births
1998 deaths
American female tennis players
Tennis people from Connecticut
Sportspeople from Stamford, Connecticut